Eastern Suburbs (now known as the Sydney Roosters) competed in their 61st season of the New South Wales Rugby League premiership in 1968.

Ladder

References

Sydney Roosters seasons
Eastern Suburbs season